Kashim Shettima Mustapha (born 2 September 1966) is a Nigerian banker and politician who is the vice president-elect of Nigeria. He has served as Senator for Borno Central since 2019. He previously served as the Governor of Borno State from 2011 to 2019.

Kashim Shettima graduated from the University of Maiduguri and the University of Ibadan. After schooling, he entered business and banking, eventually rising to hold several high-ranking executive positions at banks. By the mid-2000s, Shettima was the manager of Zenith Bank's Maiduguri office before leaving the position to enter the state cabinet of Governor Ali Modu Sheriff in 2007. After four years in the cabinet, he was elected governor in 2011 and re-elected by a wider margin in 2015; his term in office was dominated by the deadly Boko Haram insurgency. Shettima was later elected to the senate. Despite being renominated for Senate in 2023, he withdrew from the nomination to become Tinubu's running mate. Kaka-Shehu Lawan replaced him as the senate nominee.

Family 
Kashim Shettima was born into the family of Shettima Mustafa Kuttayibe on 2 September 1966 in Maiduguri, then Northern Region. He is married to Nana Shettima, and they have three children.

Education 
Shettima attended Lamisula Primary School in Maiduguri from 1972 to 1978; Government Community Secondary School, Biu in southern part of Borno State from 1978 to 1980; transferred to Government Science Secondary School, Potiskum (now in neighbouring Yobe State) where he completed his secondary education in 1983. 
He studied at the University of Maiduguri and earned a Degree (BSc) in Agricultural Economics in 1989. He had his one-year compulsory membership of the National Youths Service Corps, NYSC, at the defunct Nigerian Agricultural Cooperative Bank, Calabar, capital of Cross River State in South-South, Nigeria, from 1989 to 1990. He obtained a master's degree (MSc) in Agricultural Economics in 1991 at the University of Ibadan in Southwest, Nigeria. Shettima joined the University of Maiduguri as a Lecturer with the Department of Agricultural Economics and was in the academia from 1991 to 1993.

Early career
In 1993, he moved into the banking sector and was employed by (now defunct) Commercial Bank of Africa Limited as head of accounts unit at the bank's office in Ikeja, Lagos State, Southwest, Nigeria.  Shettima was there from 1993 to 1997.  In 1997 he crossed over to the African International Bank Limited as a Deputy Manager and rose to become a Manager in 2001. In 2001, he moved to the Zenith Bank as head of its main branch in Maiduguri. At the Zenith Bank he rose to Senior Manager/Branch Head; Assistant General Manager (AGM)/Zonal Head (North-East), Deputy General Manager/Zonal Head (North-East) before he stepped out of the Zenith Bank as a General Manager in 2007 following his appointment as Commissioner for Finance in Borno State.

Shettima worked with the Commercial Bank of Africa as an Agricultural Economist at its Ikeja Office, Lagos State (1993-1997).  
He then became a deputy manager, later manager, at the African International Bank Limited, Kaduna Branch (1997–2001), and was appointed Deputy Manager/Branch Head of the Zenith Bank's Maiduguri Office in 2001, becoming General Manager five years later. In mid-2007, Shettima was appointed Commissioner of the Borno State Ministry of Finance and Economic Development.
Later he became Commissioner in the Ministries of Local Governments and Chieftaincy Affairs, Education, Agriculture and later Health under his predecessor as Borno Governor Ali Modu Sheriff.

Political career 
From 2007 to 2011, he served as Commissioner  in 5 Ministries. In the January 2011 ANPP primaries, Engineer Modu Fannami Gubio was selected as candidate for the governorship. However, Gubio was later shot dead by gunmen, and Shettima was selected in a second primary in February 2011.
In the 26 April 2011 elections, Shettima won with 531,147 votes while the People's Democratic Party (PDP) candidate, Muhammed Goni, gained 450,140 votes. 

Shettima emerged the 2014 Governor of the Year (Leadership, Governor of the Year, 2015, (Nigeria Union of Journalists, national body); Governor of the Year, 2015 (NewsWatchTimes  n); Governor of the Year, 2015 (Vanguard newspapers); Governor of the Year, 2016 (Tell magazine; 2017 Zik Prize for Leadership;  Kaduna NUJ Award for courage and exceptional leadership (2017), FCT NUJ Merit Award for exceptional Leadership, 2017.

In February, 2019 he became the winner of the Borno Central Senatorial District election, thereby replacing Senator Babakaka Bashir.

Vice President-elect of Nigeria 
The All Progressives Congress (APC) stakeholders in Southwest on Saturday reiterated their commitment to the victory of Bola Tinubu and his running mate, Kashim Shettima, in 2023 presidential election.

See also
List of Governors of Borno State

References

Living people
1966 births
Nigerian Muslims
Governors of Borno State
All Progressives Congress state governors of Nigeria
Nigerian agriculturalists
University of Ibadan alumni
University of Maiduguri alumni
Academic staff of the University of Maiduguri